Michael Lesy (born 1945) is an American non-fiction writer. His books, which combine historical photographs with original writing, include Wisconsin Death Trip (1973), Real Life: Louisville in the Twenties (1976), Bearing Witness: A Photographic Chronicle of American Life (1982), Visible Light (1985), Murder City: The Bloody History of Chicago in the Twenties (2007), Repast: Dining Out at the Dawn of the New American Century (with Lisa Stoffer, 2013), Looking Backward: A Photographic Portrait of the World at the Beginning of the Twentieth Century (2017), and Snapshots 1971–77 (September 2021).

Lesy grew up in Shaker Heights, Ohio.  He received a B.A. in theoretical sociology from Columbia University, an M.A. in American social history from the University of Wisconsin, and a Ph.D. in American cultural history from Rutgers University. He taught at Hampshire College, in Amherst, Massachusetts, from 1990 to 2020, and is a Hampshire emeritus professor of literary journalism.  

Wisconsin Death Trip, Lesy's first book, was adapted into a film by James Marsh in 1999. Ironically, Lesy explained in a 2003 interview, "I wanted to make it a movie. But it cost too much to produce. So it was just a poor man’s way of making a movie in book form." Wisconsin Death Trip was presented on the BBC documentary series Arena in 2000. 

In 2006 the United States Artists Foundation named Lesy its first Simon Fellow. In 2013 Lesy was awarded a Guggenheim Fellowship for Photography Studies.

Bibliography

References

1945 births
American non-fiction writers
Living people
Columbia College (New York) alumni
Writers from Shaker Heights, Ohio
Rutgers University alumni
 University of Wisconsin–Madison College of Letters and Science alumni